, formally known by the stage name , is a Japanese voice actress affiliated with 81 Produce.

Anime voice roles
Azuki-chan (Tomomi "Tomo-chan" Takahashi)
Anpanman (Crayonman)
Chocotto Sister (Takeshi (ep.14, 17))
Duel Masters (Great Bucketman)
Flint the Time Detective (Genshi-kun/Flint)
Fushigiboshi no Futagohime (Buumo)
Hanasaka Tenshi Ten-Ten-kun (Ten-Ten-kun)
Hikaru no Go (Masako Kanako)
Inazuma Eleven GO Chrono Stone (Tobu)
Jyu Oh Sei (Yadou (ep.1))
Konjiki no Gash Bell!! (Nyarurato)
Mirmo Zibang! (Yashichi)
O-bake no... Holly (Kakaashin, Stereon)
PaRappa the Rapper (Servant robot (ep.7))
Pokémon Crystal: Raikou Ikazuchi no Densetsu (special) (Raichu)
Pokémon (Hiroki, Otachi, Samurai)
Rave Master (Plue, Ruby)
Rerere no Tensai Bakabon (Hajime)
xxxHolic (Jeff (Karasu Tengu) (ep.11,16,18))
Yawara! A Fashionable Judo Girl (Gonzalez)
Denji Sentai Megaranger (Komutan)

Dubbing
Rango (Lucky)

Miscellaneous
Mirmo Zibang! (Theme song performance (ED 7, ED 9))

References

External links

81 Produce voice actors
Japanese voice actresses
1965 births
Living people